Abdur Razzak Khan (28 March 1951 – 1 June 2016) was an Indian actor who has worked in Bollywood films. Khan was noted for supporting and comic roles. He was known for his comic role of Manikchand in the 1999 Abbas–Mustan directed film Baadshah, as Ninja Chacha in the 1999 film Hello Brother, and as Takkar Pehelwan in Akhiyon Se Goli Maare. His noted last film, Welcome M1LL10NS was released in 2018.

Personal life 
He was born in Dewana Baba Kulyari District Buner, Khyber Pakhtunkhwa Pakistan.

Acting career 
Khan began his onscreen journey with a small role in the television show, Nukkad (1986–87) as 'Ullasbhai', and made his Hindi film debut with Roop Ki Rani Choron Ka Raja (1993), [Tohse Pyar Ba(2008)]. He acted in more than 100 films during his 23-year-long career. He was last seen in Kyaa Kool Hain Hum 3 (2016).  His other noteworthy performances were in Raja Hindustani (1996), Hello Brother (1999), Hera Pheri (2000), Partner (2007) and Action Jackson (2014).

Death 
Khan died around 12:30 AM on 1 June 2016, following a heart attack. He was rushed to the Holy Family Hospital, Mumbai in Bandra, where a doctor declared him dead on arrival. He was buried at Byculla on 2 June 2016.

Filmography

Film

Television 
 1993 - Naya Nukkad as Ulhas Bhai 
 1996 - Zamana Badal Gaya
 1997 -   Chamatkar    as Makodi Pahalwan
 1997 - Filmi Chakkar as Pappu Kangi
 2012 – R. K. Laxman Ki Duniya in a cameo role
 2014 – Comedy Nights with Kapil as Golden Bhai

References

External links 
 
 

Indian male film actors
2016 deaths
1951 births
Male actors in Hindi cinema
Indian male comedians
Indian male television actors
20th-century Indian male actors
21st-century Indian male actors
Male actors from Hyderabad, India
Male actors in Hindi television
Male actors in Tamil cinema